Aleksandr Sergeyevich Kokorev (born 10 February 1984) is a former Russian professional football player.

Club career
He played in the Russian Football National League for FC Fakel Voronezh in 2006.

External links
 

1984 births
Footballers from Voronezh
Living people
Russian footballers
Association football forwards
FC Fakel Voronezh players
FC Oryol players
FC Khimik-Arsenal players